Samuel D. Burchard may refer to:
 Samuel D. Burchard (politician), member of the U.S. House of Representatives from Wisconsin
 Samuel D. Burchard (minister), American Presbyterian minister from New York